George James Cathie (2 May 1876 – 6 September 1958) was an Australian rules footballer who played with Melbourne in the Victorian Football League (VFL).

Notes

External links 

1876 births
1958 deaths
Australian rules footballers from Melbourne
Melbourne Football Club players